Bartolomé Ramos de Pareja (ca. 1440 – 1522) was a Spanish mathematician, music theorist, and composer. His only surviving work is the Latin treatise Musica practica.

By his own testimony at the end of his Musica practica, Ramos de Pareja was born in Baeza, possibly around 1440. Most of the biographical details of his life must be culled from this treatise. He says that he was a student of Juan de Monte and that he obtained the chair of music at the University of Salamanca for his commentaries on the works of Boethius (cum Boetium in musica legeremus). At Salamanca he had many debates with Pedro de Osma concerning his musical theories. In 1482, when he published his Musica, he revolutionarily proposed a new, five-limit division of the monochord, breaking from the Pythagorean system that had dominated the medieval ars antiqua through Boethius and Guido of Arezzo. This system of musical tuning yielded consonant perfect fourths and fifths, but the thirds and sixths were rough. Ramos de Pareja's new division was only slowly accepted. Afterwards he worked in Italy, primarily at Bologna, where his theories engendered serious controversy, even polemics, from conservatives such as Franchino Gaffurio. After a long stay there he moved to Rome, where he died shortly after 1521.

Ramos de Pareja sought to heal the divide between music in theory and in practice. To this end he sought to render the dissonant thirds and sixths consonant. He proposed the intervals 5/4, 6/5, 5/3, and 8/5 for the division of the monochord, subsequently accepted universally. Less successful was his attempt to replace hexachordal notation with a system of eight syllables denoting the eight sounds of a diatonic scale: psal-li-tur-per-vo-ces-is-tas.

The Musica practica also contains interesting commentary on mensural notation, chromatic alterations, examples of counterpoint, musical instruments, and the division of music and its effects. Ramos de Pareja was the first theorist to label the method now known as the Guidonian hand the manus Guidonis; prior to him it was called the manus musicalis. He chose the title Musica practica to emphasise the practical rather than the theoretical/mathematical component of music. Throughout Ramos de Pareja alludes to his own compositions, though few survive.

Notes

1440s births
1522 deaths
Spanish music theorists
Spanish composers
15th-century Spanish mathematicians
University of Salamanca alumni
Academic staff of the University of Salamanca